Elric: Battle at the End of Time is a board wargame published by Chaosium in 1982, an update of the 1977 game simply titled Elric.  It is based on the Elric of Melniboné books by Michael Moorcock. There have been three English language editions, Elric (1977), Elric: Battle at the End of Time (1982), and Elric (1984), published by Avalon Hill.

Gameplay
Elric is a game about Elric of Melniboné, the central protagonist in a series of novels by Michael Moorcock. In each scenario of the game, players are assigned primary personalities from the novels, and then draw cards from a deck which may be used to "muster" other personalites and armies.

Publication history
The original 1977 edition came packaged in a ziplock bag with a rule book, a paper map and counters. In 1982, the rules were updated and revised, and the production values upgraded. The game now came packaged in a box, and included a 12-page rules folio, a 22" x 34" map, and 320 die-cut double-sided counters. The price was increased from $12 to $20. In 1984, Avalon Hill published an edition of the game based on the 1982 edition, with updated box art. Hobby Japan released a Japanese language version based on the 1984 edition.

Reception
In the November–December 1977 edition of The Space Gamer (Issue No. 14), Neil Shapiro liked the game, saying, "Elric is more than a game.  It is a very accurate, emotional representation of one of Fantasy literature's greatest sagas. It is a myth made real and brought to the gameboard. As an examination of one Cycle of Moorcock's Eternal Champion, it is unique. As a game, it has few equals."

Gary Porter reviewed Elric for White Dwarf #6, giving it an overall rating of 7 out of 10, and stated that "Elric is a credit to its designer, publisher and original begetter. The lack of hexes on the map and the movement and replacement rules are very reminiscent of Russian Civil War - no bad thing. The original features: the magic cards, the battalia, the cosmic balance, etc., make this a fantasy game apart."

Several years later, Patrick Amory re-reviewed Elric in the October 1980 edition of The Space Gamer (Issue No. 32), and judged that the game had held up over the past three years: "the first scenario is smooth-playing, pleasantly unpredictable, and entertaining. As it simulates very accurately the chaos and adventure of Elric's world, the game will appeal to Moorock fans."

Murray Writtle reviewed Elric for White Dwarf #33, giving it an overall rating of 7 out of 10, and stated that "All in all an enjoyable game, recreating the books quite successfully, though a little slow to play and subject to a fair degree of chance."

In the December 1982 edition of Dragon (Issue #68), Tony Watson reviewed the revised edition, and although he liked the new components, he found for a game of strategic army combat to be too simple, and questioned the replay value: "The rules for conducting these campaigns are simplistic and uninteresting... I found the play of the game to be a bit meandering and lacking direction. This is not a game that seems to have much replay value... If atmosphere were all that mattered, Chaosium would have a winner, but as it stands, Elric is basically a game that’s all dressed up with nowhere to go, recommended for die-hard Elric fans only."

References

External links

Board games introduced in 1977
Chaosium games
Games based on novels
Greg Stafford games